Douglas Dean Maxwell (c. 1927 – August 31, 2007) was a noted Canadian journalist and broadcaster, noted for his coverage in the sport of curling.

Among his accomplishments, Maxwell served as director of the World Curling Championships for 18 years (1968–1985), is credited for inventing the Skins Game, published the Canadian Curling News for 20 years and wrote numerous books including the bestseller Canada Curls. Maxwell is also given credit for introducing time clocks to the game, and turning the World Championships into a major event.

Maxwell served as a member of CBC's first broadcast team for curling. Maxwell was inducted into the Canadian Curling Hall of Fame in 1996 as a builder. Maxwell was also awarded the World Curling Freytag Award, which later led to his induction into the WCF Hall of Fame.

Books and publications

Books by Douglas Dean Maxwell

Periodicals edited by Douglas Dean Maxwell

Family
Maxwell and his wife, Anne, lived in the Markdale, Ontario area.

Death
Doug Maxwell died of cancer, aged 80 on August 31, 2007. He was survived by his wife of 54 years, Anne Maxwell; their four children and numerous grandchildren and extended family.

References
 Curling innovator dies at 80
Douglas Dean Maxwell obituary
Curling world mourns death of Canada's Doug Maxwell

Canadian television sportscasters
Canadian sportswriters
Members of the United Church of Canada
People from Grey County
2007 deaths
Curling broadcasters
Canadian Football League announcers
Deaths from cancer in Ontario
Year of birth uncertain
Canadian newspaper editors